Spirit Warriors: The Shortcut (sometimes referred to as Spirit Warriors 2) is a 2002 Filipino adventure fantasy horror film directed by Chito S. Roño, and the sequel to Spirit Warriors (2000). The film was written and directed by Chito S. Roño with screenplay by Roy C. Iglesias. It was distributed by Regal Films.

Plot
Taking from where they last left off, Red (Danilo Barrios) and his gang were asked by Harry (Jaime Fabregas), a wealthy benefactor to complete a quest for him, and in exchange provide Red with a hefty payment. Red refused, understanding that any connection to the supernatural could lead to trouble. Unfortunately, Red's grandmother (Gloria Romero) had a sudden stroke as he was refusing the offer, convincing him to take the quest. The quest was to find the missing piece of an Agimat (a mystical amulet which have powers to heal, protect its owner from harm, and even from death). His friends, Thor (Vhong Navarro), Buboy (Jhong Hilario), Jigger (Spencer Reyes), and Ponce (Christopher Cruz) didn't know that has undertaken the task until they were given a warning by the Taga-Pagbantay (The Guardian) (Marlou Aquino), a mystical being which is a half-human and half-giant, told them that Red has joined a quest and needs their help. They suspected it was Harry's plan and had made their way to their friend. They arrive at an old ancestral house where they see Red lying on a sofa and unaware that his destiny was to search for the missing piece of agimat. This is where the adventure begins, the ancestral house was also a portal or a "Shortcut" to the world of the dead and creatures of the unknown. They first encounter a Tikbalang (a large half horse and half man), followed by Aswangs (flesh-eaters) and Tiyanaks (baby-like flesh-eaters), then Mermaids in the river who brought them to the Lugar ng mga Alon (Land of the Waves) where Red and Thor fight with identical copies of themselves (this is also where they got the missing piece of the agimat). While Red and Thor were in the Land of the Waves; Jigger, Ponce, and Buboy find their way back to the world of the living. As Red finally has the missing piece, they decide to go back to the living. But their mission does not end here, they still have to do a final task: playing a deadly game of chase with dead people, only winning by saving the last card "The Ace of Diamonds" so that Red will share the same faith, and they traveled back in time to give the agimat to the Babaylan (Witch Doctor) and gave her eternal peace.

Cast

Main roles
Vhong Navarro as Thor
Jhong Hilario as Buboy
Spencer Reyes as Jigger
Danilo Barrios as Red
Christopher Cruz as Ponce
Gloria Romero as Red's grandmother
Jaime Fabregas as Sir Harry

Supporting roles
Roy Alvarez as Nathan's stepfather
Dexter Doria as Ponce's mother
Connie Chua as the Babaylan
Daniel Pasia as the church caretaker
Marissa Sanchez as Thor's food crew partner
Warren Austria as Tony
Marlou Aquino as the Taga-pagbantay (The Guardian)

Production
The majority of the visual effects were handled by Roadrunner Network, Inc. while the creature effects were done by Mountain Rock Productions.

See also
List of ghost films

Awards

References

External links

2000s Tagalog-language films
Star Cinema films
Philippine monster movies
Engkanto films
Regal Entertainment films
Films directed by Chito S. Roño
2000s monster movies